Robert David Slater  (born 22 November 1964) is an Australian former professional soccer player and sports commentator. 

He played as a midfielder from 1982 until 2001 notably in the Premier League for Blackburn Rovers where he was amongst the title winning side of 1995. He also played in England's top flight for West Ham United and Southampton, as well as playing in the Football League for Wolverhampton Wanderers. Slater also played in Europe for Anderlecht and RC Lens as well as playing in Australia for St George Saints, Sydney United and Northern Spirit FC. He made 44 caps for Australia, scoring one goal.

Early life
Slater was born in Ormskirk, Lancashire, England, and migrated to Australia with his family where he started his playing career.

Club career

Early years
Slater played with various clubs in his youth before joining St George Saints in the National Soccer League in 1982. He won the NSL with St George in 1983, and following this season he trialled with Nottingham Forest; however St George and Nottingham Forest were unable to agree terms and he returned to Australia.

He then moved to Sydney Croatia in 1987 before an aborted move to Hajduk Split was quickly followed by a transfer to Anderlecht.

Europe
Slater did not see much playing time in Belgium and moved to then Ligue 2 club Lens, which was promoted during his time at the club (1990–94). While he was at Lens he was attacked with a baseball bat by Paris Saint-Germain supporters and nearly lost his life.

At the end of the 1993–94 season Slater moved to Blackburn Rovers, and there he became the first Australian to win the English FA Premier League in the 1994-95 season, starting many of the games in the first half of the season and contributing numerous assists. He was not a regular player in the second half of the season, but his 18 league appearances (six as a substitute) were more than enough to qualify for a title medal.

In August 1995, he was sold to West Ham United for £600,000 with Matty Holmes moving in the opposite direction. He made his debut on 26 August 1995 in a 1–1 draw away at Nottingham Forest with his first West Ham goal coming on 2 December 1995 in a 4–2 away defeat to his previous club, Blackburn Rovers. Slater made 29 appearances in all competitions, scoring two goals for West Ham before moving on to Southampton in August 1996.

After just one season in East London, Slater was signed for Southampton by manager Graeme Souness for a fee of £250,000 and was a regular throughout the 1996–97 season, making 30 Premier League appearances as the "Saints" avoided relegation by one point with a run of three victories in the final five games. These included a 2–0 victory over Slater's former club, Blackburn Rovers, in the penultimate game on 3 May 1997 in which Slater scored the opening goal, forcing the ball home from eight yards after a good run by Egil Østenstad.

In the FA Cup match at Reading on 4 January 1997, Slater was sent off by referee Graham Poll in the final minute of the match following a "gesture" to a linesman, as Southampton went down 3–1, finishing the match with only nine players.

In the summer of 1997, Souness left The Dell club, to be replaced by Dave Jones. Under Jones, Slater rarely played, making only three league starts with his final appearance coming as a substitute against Manchester United on 19 January 1998.

In March 1998, he was transferred to Wolverhampton Wanderers where he stayed briefly, playing as a substitute in the FA Cup semi final against Arsenal, before returning to Australia in the summer.

NSL
At the end of the 1997–98 season he moved back to Australia to captain a new team in the National Soccer League, the Northern Spirit. He would play with them until his retirement at the end of the 2000–01 season. In 2002, he was player-coach of Manly-Warringah.

International career
Slater won 44 caps for the Australian national team. His final appearance for Australia was against Saudi Arabia in the 1997 Confederations Cup. He is a member of the Football Federation Australia Football Hall of Fame.

After football
Slater wrote an autobiographical book in the late nineties called The Hard Way on his playing career. Slater was an analyst and commentator Fox Sports, commentating matches in the A-League, while also appearing on Fox Sports FC and Matchday Saturday, which were football coverage shows. 

Slater was involved in a controversy after writing an article for the Daily Telegraph, concerning an incident with Harry Kewell. The article led to a live confrontation on Fox Sports FC. Graham Arnold was named as source in row between Harry Kewell and Robbie Slater

Career statistics

Honours
St George
National Soccer League: 1983

Sydney United
National Soccer League Cup: 1987

Blackburn Rovers
Premier League: 1994–95

Individual
Oceania Footballer of the Year: 1991, 1993
FFA Hall of Champions: 2005
Medal of the Order of Australia for services to football

References

External links

FFA - Hall of Fame profile
Oz Football profile

1964 births
Living people
People from Ormskirk
English emigrants to Australia
Association football midfielders
Australian soccer players
Australian expatriate soccer players
Australia international soccer players
Australia B international soccer players
Australian expatriate sportspeople in England
Olympic soccer players of Australia
Footballers at the 1988 Summer Olympics
1997 FIFA Confederations Cup players
Premier League players
Ligue 1 players
Blackburn Rovers F.C. players
Blacktown City FC players
R.S.C. Anderlecht players
RC Lens players
Southampton F.C. players
Sydney United 58 FC players
West Ham United F.C. players
Wolverhampton Wanderers F.C. players
Northern Spirit FC players
English association football commentators
Association football commentators
National Soccer League (Australia) players
Expatriate footballers in France
Expatriate footballers in Belgium
Expatriate footballers in England
Recipients of the Medal of the Order of Australia